William A. Freehoff (1889-1950) was a member of the Wisconsin State Assembly and the Wisconsin State Senate.

Biography
Freehoff was born on December 27, 1889, in La Crosse County, Wisconsin. He went on to attend the University of Wisconsin-Madison. Afterwards, he joined the school's staff. On August 15, 1916, Freehoff married Ruth Florence Williams. He died on January 22, 1950, in Waukesha, Wisconsin. His father Henry Freehoff also served in the Wisconsin Legislature.

Political career
Freehoff was a member of the Assembly from 1921 to 1924. He was a Republican. In 1938, he defeated the incumbent, Democratic State Senator Chester E. Dempsey. Dempsey left the Democratic Party in 1940, and ran against Freehoff in the 1942 primary election, losing with 4,260 votes to 4,575 for Freehoff and 1020 for a third candidate. In 1946, Dempsey defeated Freehoff in the primary, with 10,075 votes to 8,798. He won the general election.

References

External links
The Political Graveyard

People from La Crosse County, Wisconsin
Politicians from Waukesha, Wisconsin
Republican Party Wisconsin state senators
Republican Party members of the Wisconsin State Assembly
University of Wisconsin–Madison faculty
University of Wisconsin–Madison alumni
1889 births
1950 deaths
20th-century American politicians